Telkoi is a town and community development block in the Kendujhar district of Odisha state in India.

Telkoi has a Community Health Centre (CHC).

Telkoi (Vidhan Sabha constituency) (Sl. No.: 20) is an Odisha Legislative Assembly constituency of Telkoi.

References

Cities and towns in Kendujhar district